Ben (uppercase: Բ, lowercase: բ; Armenian: բեն) is a letter of the Armenian alphabet, used in the Armenian language.

History 
It was developed, together with most of other letters, by Mesrop Mashtots, the creator of the alphabet, between 405 and 406.

Usage 
It is the 2nd letter of the Armenian alphabet, used in the Armenian language. In Eastern Armenian dialect, it is usually pronounced as the voiced bilabial plosive ([b]), though in some sub-dialects, it can be pronounced as the voiceless bilabial plosive ([p]), or as the aspirated voiceless bilabial plosive ([pʰ]). In the Western Armenian dialect, it is pronounced as the aspirate voiceless bilabial plosive ([pʰ]). In English, it is transliterated as letter B. In Armenian numeral system, the letter corresponds to number 2.

Encodings

References 

Armenian letters